is a railway station in the city of Itoigawa, Niigata, Japan, operated by West Japan Railway Company (JR West).

Lines
Nechi Station is served by the Ōito Line and is 25.3 kilometers from the intermediate terminus of the line at Minami-Otari Station, and is 95.4 kilometers from the terminus of the line at Matsumoto Station.

Station layout
The station consists of two ground-level opposed side platforms connected by a level crossing, serving two tracks. The station is unattended.

Platforms

History
Nechi Station opened on 14 November 1934. With the privatization of Japanese National Railways (JNR) on 1 April 1987, the station came under the control of JR West.

Passenger statistics
In fiscal 2016, the station was used by an average of 6 passengers daily (boarding passengers only).

Surrounding area
Amegazari Onsen
Shio-no-michi Museum

See also
 List of railway stations in Japan

References

External links

 JR West station information 

Railway stations in Niigata Prefecture
Railway stations in Japan opened in 1934
Ōito Line
Stations of West Japan Railway Company
Itoigawa, Niigata